is a PlayStation video game released only in Japan in 1998 by Toho Co., Ltd. It featured almost every Toho kaiju up to that point as well as 6 new monsters created exclusively for the game.

References

Godzilla games
Digital collectible card games
Japan-exclusive video games
PlayStation (console) games
PlayStation (console)-only games
1998 video games
Video games developed in Japan
Toho
Single-player video games